Lennia lota, the scarce small recluse, is a species of butterfly in the family Hesperiidae. It is found in Ghana, Cameroon, the Central African Republic and the central part of the Democratic Republic of the Congo. The habitat consists of forests.

References

Butterflies described in 1937
Hesperiinae